The 1969 World Archery Championships was the 25th edition of the event. It was held in Valley Forge National Historical Park, United States on 11–20 August 1969 and was organised by World Archery Federation (FITA).

This was the first time the event was held outside of Europe, and was held alongside the inaugural World Field Archery Championships. It was also the first event which saw representation from the Soviet Union.

Medals summary

Recurve

Medals table

References

External links
 World Archery website
 Complete results

World Championship
World Archery
World Archery Championships
World Archery
International archery competitions hosted by the United States